"Paper" is the second song of a double-A sided single from the American hip-hop artist Queen Latifah's 1998 album, Order in the Court. "Paper" is one of the first Queen Latifah songs that does not include any rapping. Essentially, "Paper" is a cover of Norman Whitfield and Barrett Strong's "I Heard It Through the Grapevine" with significantly altered lyrics. The song features Pras and background vocals by Jazz-a-Belle.

Production 
"Paper" was produced by Pras of the Fugees and Jerry Duplessis. The song was recorded at Chung King Studios in New York City.

Music video

References 

1997 songs
Queen Latifah songs
Songs written by Norman Whitfield
Songs written by Barrett Strong
Songs written by Queen Latifah
Songs written by Pras
Motown singles
Music videos directed by Paul Hunter (director)